Anton Lajovic (1878 in Vače – 1960 in Ljubljana) was a Slovenian composer. He was noted for his Lieder and was influenced by the late-romantic French school.

References

1878 births
1960 deaths
Slovenian composers
Male composers
People from the Municipality of Litija
Slovenian male musicians